The Sai Bollywood Film City in India is located in Dikwal Village, Nandos, Malvan Taluka, District Sindhudurg in Maharashtra. It is the first Bollywood film city in the world. It is also a popular tourism and leisure place, containing both the film city and an entertainment zone.

Sai Bollywood Film City was established by Sai Bollywood Film City India Pvt. Ltd., and developed by Sai Srishti Developers with the investment of Rs 2000 crore (Rs 20,000,000,000, or about $325,000,000. The film city was approved by the Maharashtra Tourism Development Corporation (MTDC). The city built a Hollywood-style sign saying Bollywood on a hill, as in California.

References

External links
 Official Website
 Photos of Sai Srishti Developers launch 'Bollywood - The Film City'

Hindi cinema
Indian film studios
Film production companies of Maharashtra
Sindhudurg district
2014 establishments in Maharashtra
Indian companies established in 2014
Mass media companies established in 2014